The Nepali Army, technically the Gorkhali Army (see Gorkhas), is the land service branch of the Nepali Armed Forces. After the Gorkha Kingdom was founded in 1559, its army was established in 1560, and was accordingly known as the Gorkhali Army. The Gorkhali Army later became known also as the Royal Nepali Army following the Unification of Nepal, when the Gorkha Kingdom expanded its territory, to include the whole of the country, by conquering and annexing the other states in the region, resulting in the establishment of a single united Hindu monarchy in the whole Nepal. It was officially renamed simply to the Nepali Army on 28 May 2008, upon the abolition of the 240-year-old Nepalese monarchy, and of the 449-year-old rule of the Shah dynasty in Nepal, shortly after the Nepalese Civil War.

The Nepali Army has participated in various conflicts throughout its history, going as far back as the Nepali unification campaign launched by Prithvi Narayan Shah of the Gorkha Kingdom. It has engaged in an extensive number of battles within South Asia, and continues to take part in global conflicts as part of United Nations peacekeeping coalitions.

The Nepali Army is headquartered in Kathmandu, Nepal and the incumbent Chief of Army Staff is General Prabhu Ram Sharma.

History

The Nepal unification campaign was a turning point in the history of the Nepali army. Since unification was not possible without a strong army, the management of the armed forces had to be exceptional. Apart from the standard Malla era temples in Kathmandu, the army organized itself in Gorkha. Technicians and experts had to be brought in from abroad to manufacture war materials. After the Gorkhali troops captured Nuwakot, the hilly northern part of Kathmandu (Kantipur) in 1744, the Gorkhali armed forces came to be known as the Royal Nepali Army.

Their performance impressed their enemies so much that the British East-India Company started recruiting Nepali troops into their forces. The native British soldiers called the new soldiers "Gurkhas".
The Gurkha-Sikh War began shortly after, in 1809. In 1946, the Royal Nepali Army troops were led by Commanding General Sir Baber Shamsher Jang Bahadur Rana at the Victory Parade in London.

Former Indian Army COAS Field Marshal Sam Manekshaw once stated that: "If a man says he is not afraid of dying, he is either lying or he is a Gorkhali."

Prior to 2006, the Nepali Army was known as the Royal Nepali Army and was under the control of the King of Nepal. Following the Loktantra Andolan (People's Movement for Democracy) on May 18, 2006, a bill was passed by the Nepali parliament curtailing royal power, which included renaming the army.

In 2004, Nepal spent $99.2 million on its military (1.5% of its GDP). Since 2002, the RNA had been involved in the Nepali Civil War. They were also used to quell the pro-democracy protesters in April 2006 Loktantra Andolan.

Organization

The Nepali Army has about 95,000 infantry army and air service members protecting the sovereignty of Nepal. In August 2018, The Himalayan Times estimated total army forces to be around 96,000 while The Kathmandu Post estimated it to be 92,000.

Chiefs of the Nepali Army 

The Chief of the Nepali Army have been mostly drawn from noble Chhetri families from Gorkha such as "Pande dynasty", "Kunwar family", "Basnyat dynasty", and "Thapa dynasty" before the rule of "Rana dynasty". During the Shah monarchy, the officers were drawn from these aristocratic families. During the Rana dynasty, Ranas overtook the position as birthright. The first army chief of Nepal was King Prithvi Narayan Shah who drafted and commanded the Nepali (Gorkhali) Army. The first civilian army chief was Kaji Kalu Pande who had significant role in the campaign of Nepal. He was considered as army head due to the undertaking of duties and responsibilities of the army but not by the formalization of the title.

Mukhtiyar Bhimsen Thapa was the first person to use Commander-in-Chief as the title of army chief. King Rajendra Bikram Shah appointed Bhimsen to the post of Commander-in-Chief and praised Bhimsen for long service to the nation. However, on 14 June 1837, the King took over the command of all the battalions put in charge of various courtiers, and himself became the Commander-in-Chief. Immediately after the incarceration of the Thapas in 1837, Dalbhanjan Pande and Rana Jang Pande were the joint head of military administration. However, Rana Jang was removed after 3 months in October 1837.

Since the regime of Mukhtiyar Bhimsen, only seven army chiefs of Nepal were non-Rana Chhetris including Shahs while others were all Ranas till 1951. Commander-in-Chief (C-in-C) was replaced by Chief of the Army Staff (COAS) from the reign of General Singha Pratap Shah.

Operations

Battles defending the Kingdom of Nepal 
Battle against Mir Qasim – 1763 AD
Battle of Pauwa Gadhi against Captain Kinloch- 1767 AD
 Anglo-Nepali War – 1814 AD
 First Nepal – Tibet War
 Nepal-Tibet/China War
Last Nepal-Tibet War
Nepali Civil War

Battles during the unification of Nepal

Battle of Kirtipur
Battle of Kathmandu
Battle of Bhaktapur
Limbuwan-Gorkha War
Invasion of Doti Kingdom

International conflicts
 Indian Sepoy Mutiny
 World War I (Casualties)
 Waziristan War
 Afghan War (1919)
 World War II
 Hyderabad Action (1948)

International operations
The Nepali Army has contributed more than 100,000 peacekeepers to a variety of United Nations-sponsored peacekeeping missions such as:
 United Nations Interim Force in Lebanon (UNIFIL),
 UNOSOMII the United Nations Protection Force (UNPROFOR), UN Operational Mission Somalia II,
 MINUSTAH the United Nations Mission in Haiti.
 UNAMSIL – Currently, Nepal is sending an 800-man battalion to serve in the peacekeeping mission in Sierra Leone (UNAMSIL).
 UNMIS – The Nepali Army has sent a protection company of 200 personnel in United Nations Mission In Sudan. The Redeployment Coordination HQ at Kassala is also manned by the Nepali contingent. The RCHQ was intended to monitor withdrawals from the eastern sectors of the UNMIS area under the Sudan Comprehensive Peace Accord.

 UNDOF
 MINUSMA – For the first time, the Nepali Army has a company of EOD of 140 personnel specially dedicated for improvised explosive device (IED) and ordnance disposal mission  in Mali.

U.S./Nepal military relations

The U.S.-Nepali military relationship focuses on support for democratic institutions, civilian control of the military, and the professional military ethic to include respect for human rights.
The US would support Nepal with arms, ammunition and additional commandos and soldiers if war began with its neighboring China but resisted giving any support if war broke out with India as in is an essential ally to the US in the Indo-Pacific against China and has also signed COMCASA with the US in the 2+2 meeting in September 2018. Both countries have had extensive contact over the years. Nepali Army units have served with distinction alongside American forces in places such as Haiti, Iraq, and Somalia.

U.S.-Nepali military engagement continues today through IMET, Enhanced International Peacekeeping Capabilities (EIPC), Global Peace Operations Initiative (GPOI), and various conferences and seminars. The U.S. military sends many Nepali Army officers to America to attend military schooling, such as the Command and General Staff College and the U.S. Army War College. The IMET budget for FY2001 was $220,000.

The EIPC program is an inter-agency program between the Department of Defense and the Department of State to increase the pool of international peacekeepers and to promote interoperability. Nepal received about $1.9 million in EPIC funding.

Commander in Chief, Pacific (CINCPAC) coordinates military engagement with Nepal through the Office of Defense Cooperation (ODC). The ODC Nepal is located in the American Embassy Kathmandu.

Units
The first four army units of the Nepali Army are the Shreenath, Kali Baksh (Kalibox), Barda Bahadur, and Sabuj companies founded in August 1762 by the King Prithvi Narayan Shah with Khas/Chhetri and Thakuri clans well before the Gorkha conquest of Nepal. The Purano Gorakh Company was founded in February 1763 and is the fifth oldest unit of the Nepal army.

 Shree Nath Battalion – established 1762
 Shree Kali Buksh Battalion  – established 1762
 Shree Barda Bahadur Battalion – established 1762
 Shree Sabuj Battalion – established 1762
 Shree Purano Gorakh Battalion  – established 1763
 Shree Devi Datta Battalion – established 1783
 Shree Naya Gorakh Battalion – established 1783
 Shree Bhairavi Dal Battalion – established 1785
 Shree Singhanath Battalion – established 1786 (Commando)
 Shree Shreejung Battalion – established 1783
 Shree Ranabhim Battalion – established 1783
 Shree Naya Shree Nath Battalion – established 1783
 Shree Vajradal Company – established 1806
 Shree Shree Mehar Battalion - established 1836
 Shree 'The Famous' Mahindra Dal Battalion -established 1844 A.D -1901 B.S.
 Shree Rajdal Regiment (Artillery) (Currently expanded to three additional independent Artillery regiments)
 Shree Ganeshdal Battalion – established 1846 – signals and communications
 Shree Nepal Cavalry – established 1849 – Household Cavalry ceremonial unit since 1952
 Shree Kali Prasad Battalion (Engineers) – established 1863
 Shree Bhairavnath Battalion – established 1910 – (Parachute Battalion)
 Shree Bhagvati Prasad Company – established 1927
 Shree Khadga Dal Battalion - established 1937
 Shree Parshwavarti Company – established 1936 – served as PM's Body Guard unit and disbanded 1952
 Shree Gorkah Bahadur Battalion –  established 1952 (best infantry unit of NA, then was developed for special duty of Royal Guards).
 Shree Jagadal Battalion (Air Defence)
 Shree Yuddha Kawaj Battalion (Mechanized Infantry)
 Shree Mahabir Battalion (Rangers Battalion. Equivalent to U.S Army Rangers (Part of Nepali Army Special Operation Force))
 Shree Chandan Nath Battalion –  established 2004 (Infantry Unit)
 Shree Tara Dal Battalion –  established 2002 (Infantry Unit)
 Shree No 1 Disaster Management Battalion –  established 2012
 Shree No 2 Disaster Management Battalion –  established 2012

Equipment
The majority of equipment used by the Nepali Army is imported from other countries. India is the army's largest supplier of arms and ammunition as well as other logistical equipment, which are often furnished under generous military grants. Germany, the United States, Belgium, Israel, and South Korea have also either supplied or offered arms to the Nepali Army.

Army's first standard rifle was the Belgian FN FAL, which it adopted in 1960. Nepali FALs were later complemented by unlicensed, Indian-manufactured variants of the same weapon, as well its British counterpart, the L1A1 Self-Loading Rifle. Beginning in 2002 these were officially supplemented in army service by the American M-16 rifle, which took the FAL's place as the army's standard service rifle. Nevertheless, the FAL and its respective variants remain the single most prolific weapon in Nepali army service, with thousands of second-hand examples being supplied by India as late as 2005.

Small arms

Heavy weapons

Vehicles

Rank structure

Commissioned Officers

Other ranks

See also
 List of mountain warfare forces
Military of Nepal
Armed Police Force Nepal
Nepal Police
National Investigation Department of Nepal
List of operation by Gurkha Army

Notes

References

Books

External links
Official website of the Nepali Army
Official website of the Nepali Army Command and Staff College
Nepal
Background Note: Nepal
Nepal
List of photographs of 49 Nepali army generals

Kaji Biraj Thapa Magar of Gorkha
Biraj Thapa Magar
https://thediplomat.com/2013/10/the-deft-politicking-of-nepals-army/1/, 2013
 Ghimire, S. (2016). Security Sector Reform Organic: Infrastructure for Peace as an Entry Point? Peacebuilding.

Army
Nepal
.
Nepali Army

ne:नेपाली सेना
sv:Nepalesiska armén